Sinochem International Co., Ltd. v. Malaysia International Shipping Corporation, 549 U.S. 422 (2007), was a case decided by the United States Supreme Court, in which the court held a United States district court has discretion to respond at once to a defendant's forum non conveniens plea, and need not take up first any other threshold objection. In particular, a court need not resolve whether it has authority to adjudicate the cause (subject-matter jurisdiction) or personal jurisdiction over the defendant if it determines that, in any event, a foreign tribunal is the more suitable arbiter of the merits of the case.

See also
 List of United States Supreme Court cases, volume 549
List of United States Supreme Court cases

External links
 

United States Supreme Court cases
2007 in United States case law
United States Supreme Court cases of the Roberts Court